Death Goes to School is a 1953 British mystery film directed by Stephen Clarkson and starring Barbara Murray, Gordon Jackson and Pamela Alan. It was made at Merton Park Studios as a second feature.

Police investigate the death of a tyrannical teacher at a girls school, where any number of people might have killed the dead woman.

Cast
 Barbara Murray as Miss Shepherd  
 Gordon Jackson as Detective Inspector Campbell 
 Pamela Alan as Miss Helen Cooper  
 Jane Aird as Miss M. Halstead  
 Beatrice Varley as Miss Hopkinson  
 Anne Butchart as Miss Oliphant  
 Imogene Moynihan as Miss Essex  
 Jenine Matto as Miss Stanislaus 
 Sam Kydd as Sergeant Harvey  
 Robert Long as Mr. Lawley  
 Nina Parry as Mary  
 Stanley Rose as Inspector Burgess  
 Enid Stewart as Mrs. White 
 Julie Stewart as Mrs. White 
 Sandra Whipp as Brenda  
 Pauline Winter as Mrs. Lawley

References

Bibliography
 Chibnall, Steve & McFarlane, Brian. The British 'B' Film. Palgrave MacMillan, 2009.

External links

1953 films
British mystery films
1950s mystery films
Films set in England
Merton Park Studios films
British black-and-white films
1950s English-language films
1950s British films